Radio Corporation of China (中國無線電公司) was the first radio station in China.

History 
It was founded in January 1923 by New Zealander Ernest George Hayward Osborn.  It was not a radio station run by Chinese citizens, and was shut down by the Northern warlords before 1927.

Influence 
Radio stations became a new communication method, and the first Chinese-run radio station was established in Harbin.  It went into operation in October 1926.  Privately run stations were established in Shanghai in March 1927.

The technology became vital to the struggle between the Communist Party of China and the Nationalist Party.  The first major Chinese radio station established with a legit infrastructure was the Central Broadcasting System in 1928 by the Nationalist Party.  The CPC would establish the Yan'an Xinhua Broadcasting Station in 1940.

See also 
 History of Radio

References 

Chinese companies established in 1923
Radio stations disestablished in 1927
Mass media in China
Radio stations established in 1923
1927 disestablishments in China